Auger is a French surname. Notable people with the surname include:

 Alfred Auger (1889–1917), French-Algerian World War I flying ace
 Anne Auger, French computer scientist
 Arleen Auger (1939–1993), American soprano
 Athanase Auger (1734–1792), French educator and translator
 Antoine-Augustin Auger (born 1761), French politician
 Brian Auger (born 1939), British jazz and rock keyboardist
 Claudine Auger (1941–2019), French cinematic actress
 Edmond Auger (1530–1591), French Jesuit
 Félix Auger-Aliassime (born 2000), Canadian tennis player, brother of Malika
 Gerald Auger (born 1978), Canadian actor and producer
 Henry Lemaître Auger (1873–1948), Canadian politician
 Isabelle Auger (born 1969), Canadian water polo player 

 John Auger (c. 1678–1718), pirate
 Joseph-Oscar Auger (1873–1942), Canadian politician
 Langdon Auger, stage name of Scott Langejan, Canadian rap musician
 Louis-Mathias Auger (1902–1966), Canadian teacher and politician
 Louis-Simon Auger (1772–1839), French journalist and playwright
 Ludovic Auger (born 1971), French racing cyclist
 Malika Auger-Aliassime (born 1998), Canadian tennis player, sister of Félix
 Michel Auger (politician) (1830–1909), Canadian politician, farmer and industrialist 
 Michel Auger (born 1944), Canadian crime reporter
 Michel C. Auger, Canadian political columnist
 Pierre Victor Auger (1899–1993), French physicist and discoverer of the Auger effect
 Pierre-Michel Auger (born 1963), Canadian politician
 Ryan Auger (born 1994), English footballer
 Stéphane Auger (born 1970), Canadian ice hockey referee

 Tito Auger (born 1968), Puerto-Rican musician
 Daniel d'Auger de Subercase (1661–1732), French naval officer

French-language surnames
English-language surnames